Giancarlos Fabián Ochoa Gonzales (born 18 April 2005), is a Bolivian footballer who plays as a forward for The Strongest.

Career statistics

Club

Notes

References

2005 births
Living people
Bolivian footballers
Association football forwards
Bolivian Primera División players
The Strongest players